The Biomedical Sciences Research Center "Alexander Fleming" is a non-profit research organisation based in Vari, Athens, Greece. The Center is named after the scientist Alexander Fleming and his widow, Amalia Fleming "created the conditions to set up" this Center.

Since the beginning of its operations in 1998, the Center develops basic as well as translational and applied research programs at the cutting edge of modern biomedical sciences.  Currently, the Center hosts 14 research groups distributed in 4 Institutes (Immunology, Molecular Oncology, Molecular Biology and Genetics, Cellular & Developmental Biology). Over the short period since its establishment, BSRC Al. Fleming has gained extensive visibility in the European science arena.

Fleming's researchers have established transgenic animal models for rheumatoid arthritis, inflammatory bowel disease and multiple sclerosis and these models have served as a basis for multiple collaborations with the international biopharmaceutical industry in the evaluation of novel therapeutic compounds, or as tools for collaborative R&D.

The Center is equipped with state-of-the-art Core Units which include: an Expression Profiling Facility, a Flow Cytometry Facility, a Protein Chemistry Lab, a Transgenics and gene targeting Unit, and a BioIT Unit, all of which serve internal collaborations, as well as external partners in academia and industry. The Center also runs an Innovation and Enterprise Unit that facilitates the protection and exploitation of the Center’s research and technologies.

Fleming operates its own Animal House, which can house up to 20,000 mice and has its own complete mouse histopathology unit. Fleming’s Animal house (certified with ISO 9001) provides husbandry of animals and services to the biomedical research community since 2001. It covers an area of approximately 600 m2 within the Center and is equipped with highly automated systems that provide the best possible conditions for mouse reproduction and maintenance. Its main activity is the reproduction and maintenance of mice stocks either of inbred strains or genetically engineered mice, such as transgenic and knockout mouse lines, as well as chemically induced mutants developed by Fleming researchers. The Animal House has a capacity to house more than 20,000 mice and is currently the largest Mouse Unit in Greece in terms of number and variety of mice. The Facility became a full member of EMMA in 2009.

Main areas of research: Functional genomics and proteomics; Molecular and cellular immunology; Animal models of human disease; Transcriptional and post-transcriptional mechanisms of gene regulation; DNA repair; Stem Cell differentiation; Epigenetics; Learning and memory; ECM biology.
Fields of excellence: Molecular mechanisms of disease (inflammation, cancer, metabolic syndrome, CNS disorders)

See also 
 Biomedical research

References

External links
Official website

Medical and health organizations based in Greece
Buildings and structures in Athens
Medical research institutes
Organizations based in Athens